The Berkeley Daily Planet was a free weekly newspaper published in Berkeley, California,  which continues today as an internet-based news publication.

The Daily Planet is politically progressive, and offers endorsements of progressive and liberal to left leaning candidates.

The Berkeley Daily Planet provides coverage of City Council meetings as well as other official city functions and commissions. The Planet distinguishes itself from other local news sources in its detailed coverage of local land use issues in the city.

History
The Berkeley Daily Planet was founded April 7, 1999 by a group of journalists and Stanford MBAs with funding from outside investors. In September 2000, the Daily Planet'''s owners, doing business as Bigfoot Media, started a second free daily, the San Mateo Daily Journal.

On November 22, 2002, due to the soft Bay Area retail economy, the Berkeley Daily Planet suspended publishing temporarily. "Employees arrived at work this morning only to learn the newspaper's board of directors had decided to shutter the paper," the Daily Californian wrote in its November 22, 2002 issue. The Daily Cal noted that the Los Angeles Times speculated in January 2002 that the Daily Planet had not made a profit since its inception in 1999, a contention the owners said was not true.

On April 1, 2003, Becky and Michael O'Malley—described by the San Francisco Chronicle as a "liberal Berkeley couple who are grandparents and longtime activists"—began publishing the Berkeley Daily Planet again, but only twice a week, Tuesday and Friday. However, they kept the word "Daily" in the paper's name.

Since the O'Malleys restarted the Planet with Michael O'Malley as publisher, Becky O'Malley as executive editor and Michael Howerton as managing editor, it has won a number of awards from the California Newspaper Publishers' Association and other organizations, including first prizes for its opinion page, which publishes lengthy reader-written commentaries, and the editorial cartoons of Justin DeFreitas.

On February 4, 2010 the Planet broke a story that "Clickbooks.com", their own payroll firm, had conducted fraud.  The firm had under-reported employee income to the IRS, and pocketed the difference in payroll tax.

In March, 2010, the Daily Planet ceased production of its print edition altogether, and since then it has been online only. Financial reasons were cited by its publishers.  Almost from its inception the Daily Planet published an online version, in addition to its newsprint edition. The online archives go back to April 1, 2000.

Current owners
Becky O'Malley, the executive editor and opinion page editor, worked in the civil rights and anti-war movements in Ann Arbor in the 1960s and early 1970s.  She was a reporter and editor for the San Francisco Bay Guardian and Pacific News Service in the late 1970s while attending law school.  After passing the California Bar, she wrote articles for magazines, including The Nation and Mother Jones, and was on the staff of the Center for Investigative Reporting. Her husband Michael O'Malley, now the Planets publisher, is a former faculty member in the University of California's computer science department whose primary research was in the field of text-to-speech conversion technology.  The couple founded a company in the early 1980s, Berkeley Speech Technologies, which developed commercial text-to-speech software and hardware. They sold it to a Belgian speech technology corporation, Lernout & Hauspie, in 1996. After the speech company was sold, Becky O'Malley served on Berkeley's Landmarks Preservation Commission for 7 years, resigning after taking over the editor's job at the Planet.

Editorial controversies
O'Malley wrote in 2004 that the paper repeatedly was criticized for its position on the Israeli–Palestinian conflict. In August 2006, the paper published a letter, later characterized by some readers as an anti-Semitic diatribe, in the opinion section of the Planet. It was a response from an Iranian student living in India to Israel's invasion of Lebanon, and included his charge that Jews were to blame for the Holocaust. Two open letters containing criticisms were sent to Ms. O'Malley by local politicians and Jewish leaders and were published in the August 11th issue of the Daily Planet.

Struggling financially in the bad economy, in early 2009 the Daily Planet published a full front page asking for donations, resulting in $12,000 in the first two weeks. In March 2009 the paper ran a letter from the proprietor of Urban Ore reporting that a Jim Sinkinson, representing “East Bay Citizens for Journalistic Responsibility”, asked her to stop advertising there; she claimed that he misrepresented what the Planet had been publishing. The paper subsequently printed "An Open Letter to Our Advertisers and Readers" to "clarify the policies of the paper, its overall mission, and the nature of this campaign of intimidation"; Sinkinson denied pressuring or threatening advertisers. The dispute was covered in The New York Times'' in November 2009.

See also

 Twin Cities Daily Planet
 Daily Planet (Philadelphia newspaper)
 Daily Planet DC
 Asheville Daily Planet
 Telluride Daily Planet

Notes

External links
 Berkeley Daily Planet Website
 Berkeley Daily Planet Watch Dog Website
 Publishers hope Berkeley has space for a new tabloid
 Berkeley Daily Planet ends publication; Closing comes as surprise
 Berkeley Daily Planets Debut is Filled with Gravity; New Berkeley tabloid criticized because it lifted classified ads
 Daily Cal: Breaking News: Daily Planet Folds
 Berkeley Daily Planet rises again; Preservationist couple revive independent paper -- twice a week

Newspapers published in the San Francisco Bay Area
PEN Oakland/Josephine Miles Literary Award winners
Weekly newspapers published in California